Sir Thomas Lee, 2nd Baronet (ca. 1661 – 13 August 1702) was an English politician who sat in the House of Commons  from 1689 to 1699.

Lee was the son of Sir Thomas Lee, 1st Baronet of Hartwell and his wife Anne Davis, daughter of Sir John Davis of Pangborne, Berkshire.

In 1689, Lee was elected Member of Parliament for Aylesbury and held the seat until 1699.  He succeeded to the baronetcy of Hartwell on the death of his father in 1691.  Following his return at the general election  in July 1698, his election was declared void  on 7 February 1699.
 
Lee married Alice Hopkins, daughter of Thomas Hopkins a merchant of London. His eldest son Thomas succeeded to the baronetcy, his second son William became Lord Chief Justice, his third son John and his fifth son George became MPs.

References

1661 births
1702 deaths
Baronets in the Baronetage of England
English MPs 1689–1690
English MPs 1690–1695
English MPs 1695–1698
English MPs 1698–1700